Mary Treen (born Mary Louise Summers, March 27, 1907 – July 20, 1989) was an American film and television actress. A minor actress for much of her career, she managed to secure a plain, unassuming niche for herself in dozens of movies and television shows during the Hollywood of the 1940s, 1950s and 1960s in a career spanning more than 40 years.

Early years
Treen was born in St. Louis, Missouri, the daughter of attorney Don C. Summers and actress Helene Sullivan Summers. In 1908, when she was 11 months old, her mother sued her father for divorce on the grounds that he failed to provide for her. Her father died while she was an infant. She was reared in California by her mother and stepfather, a physician. She attended the Westlake School for Girls and a convent where she tried out successfully in school plays. She was a Roman Catholic.

Career
During her career, Treen was seen in over 40 films. Among her film roles were Tilly, the secretary of the Building and Loan, in Frank Capra's It's a Wonderful Life (1946) starring James Stewart, and the role of Pat in the drama Kitty Foyle (1940) starring Ginger Rogers.

In the 1954–1955 season, Treen appeared in 38 episodes as Emily Dodger on the CBS situation comedy Willy. Her longest-running role was as Hilda, the maid and baby nurse in 64 episodes of the NBC and CBS sitcom The Joey Bishop Show from 1962 to 1965. 

Treen was a Republican who supported the campaign of Dwight Eisenhower during the 1952 presidential election.

Death
Treen died of cancer at her home in Newport Beach, California, on July 20, 1989, at age 82. Her only survivors were distant cousins. One of her cousins was actor Mort Mills, who also had a prolific niche cinema and television career of similar durability.

Partial filmography

 Viennese Nights (1930) – Shocked Woman on Street (uncredited)
 Crooner (1932) – One of Teddy's Fans (uncredited)
 Jimmy the Gent (1934) – Nurse (scenes deleted)
 Happiness Ahead (1934) – Bob's Comedienne Friend
 The St. Louis Kid (1934) – Giddy Girl (scenes deleted)
 Babbitt (1934) – Miss McGoun, Babbitt's Secretary
 Maybe It's Love (1935) – Secretary (uncredited)
 Red Hot Tires (1935) – Maggie
 Sweet Music (1935) – Girl at the Railroad (uncredited)
 A Night at the Ritz (1935) – Isabelle, Hassler's Secretary
 Traveling Saleslady (1935) – Miss Wells
 The Case of the Curious Bride (1935) – Telegraph Office Clerk (uncredited)
 G Men (1935) – Gregory's Secretary (uncredited)
 Go into Your Dance (1935) – Silent Showgirl (uncredited)
 The Girl from 10th Avenue (1935) – Secretary (uncredited)
 Front Page Woman (1935) – Nurse (uncredited)
 Don't Bet on Blondes (1935) – Owen's secretary
 Broadway Gondolier (1935) – 2nd Irate Caller (uncredited)
 Page Miss Glory (1935) – Beauty Shop Operator
 I Live for Love (1935) – Clementine – Donna's Maid
 The Case of the Lucky Legs (1935) – Spudsy's Wife
 Shipmates Forever (1935) – Cowboy's Girl (uncredited)
 I Found Stella Parish (1935) – Sob Sister (uncredited)
 Miss Pacific Fleet (1935) – Violet Johnson – Butch's Girl (uncredited)
 Broadway Hostess (1935) – Nurse (uncredited)
 Dangerous (1935) – Huree – a Nurse (uncredited)
 The Murder of Dr. Harrigan (1936) – Nurse Margaret Brody
 Freshman Love (1936) – Squirmy
 Colleen (1936) – Miss Hively – Cedric's Secretary (uncredited)
 Brides Are Like That (1936) – Jennie
 Snowed Under (1936) – Secretary Taking Mike's Dictation (uncredited)
 The Singing Kid (1936) – Secretary (scenes deleted)
 The Golden Arrow (1936) – Appleby's Secretary (uncredited)
 Murder by an Aristocrat (1936) – Florrie
 Public Enemy's Wife (1936) – Telephone Operator (uncredited)
 Jailbreak (1936) – Gladys Joy
 Love Begins at 20 (1936) – Alice Gillingwater
 Stage Struck (1936) – Ms. Warren (uncredited)
 Down the Stretch (1936) – Nurse
 The Captain's Kid (1936) – Libby, the Housekeeper
 Fugitive in the Sky (1936) – Agatha Ormsby
 God's Country and the Woman (1937) – Miss Flint
 Maid of Salem (1937) – Susy Abbott
 They Gave Him a Gun (1937) – Saxe
 The Go Getter (1937) – Mrs. Blair
 Ever Since Eve (1937) – Employment Clerk
 Dance Charlie Dance (1937) – Jennie Wolfe – Arden's Agent
 Marry the Girl (1937) – Kidnapped Nurse (uncredited)
 Talent Scout (1937) – Janet Morris
 Mr. Dodd Takes the Air (1937) – Fan with Locket (uncredited)
 Second Honeymoon (1937) – Elsie
 Missing Witnesses (1937) – Woman Waiting in Lane's Office (uncredited)
 Change of Heart (1938) – Stenographer (uncredited)
 Swing It, Sailor! (1938) – Gertie Burns
 Sally, Irene and Mary (1938) – Miss Barkow
 Kentucky Moonshine (1938) – 'Sugar' Hatfield
 Rascals (1938) – Patient (uncredited)
 Always Goodbye (1938) – Al's Bride-to-Be (uncredited)
 Young Fugitives (1938) – Kathy
 I'll Give a Million (1938) – Nanette (uncredited)
 Strange Faces (1938) – Lorry May
 Pride of the Navy (1939) – Minor Role (uncredited)
 Three Smart Girls Grow Up (1939) – Secretary (uncredited)
 For Love or Money (1939) – Amy, The Maid
 When Tomorrow Comes (1939) – Waitress (uncredited)
 Babes in Arms (1939) – Receptionist (uncredited)
 Dad for a Day (1939, Short) – Employment Agency Receptionist (uncredited)
 First Love (1939) – Agnes, Barbara's Maid
 Danger on Wheels (1940) – Esme
 Double Alibi (1940) – Hospital Switchboard Operator
 Girl in 313 (1940) – Jenny, Hotel Maid
 Queen of the Mob (1940) – Billy's Nurse
 Black Diamonds (1940) – Nina Norton
 Dulcy (1940) – Miss Twill (uncredited)
 Kitty Foyle (1940) – Pat Day
 Tall, Dark and Handsome (1941) – Martha, Sales Girl
 The Flame of New Orleans (1941) – Party Guest (uncredited)
 Father Takes a Wife (1941) – Secretary
 You Belong to Me (1941) – Doris
 Pacific Blackout (1941) – Irene
 Roxie Hart (1942) – Secretary (uncredited)
 The Night Before the Divorce (1942) – Olga – the Maid
 True to the Army (1942) – Mae
 Ship Ahoy (1942) – Nurse (uncredited)
 The Great Man's Lady (1942) – Persis
 They All Kissed the Bride (1942) – Susie Johnson
 Between Us Girls (1942) – Mary Belle
 Stand By All Networks (1942) – Nora Cassidy
 My Heart Belongs to Daddy (1942) – Dawn (uncredited)
 Lady Bodyguard (1943) – Miss Tracy
 The Powers Girl (1943) – Nancy
 Flight for Freedom (1943) – Newspaper Woman (uncredited)
 They Got Me Covered (1943) – Helen
 Hit Parade of 1943 (1943) – Janie
 So Proudly We Hail! (1943) – Lt. Sadie Schwartz
 Thank Your Lucky Stars (1943) – Fan (uncredited)
 Mystery Broadcast (1943) – Smitty
 Hands Across the Border (1944) – Sophie Lawrence
 The Navy Way (1944) – Agnes
 Swing in the Saddle (1944) – Addie LaTour
 I Love a Soldier (1944) – Cecilia 'Cissy' Grant
 Casanova Brown (1944) – Monica Case
 Tahiti Nights (1944) – Mata
 High Powered (1945) – Cassie McQuade
 Don Juan Quilligan (1945) – Lucy Blake
 Blonde from Brooklyn (1945) – Diane Peabody
 She Wouldn't Say Yes (1945) – Train Passenger at Bar
 A Guy Could Change (1946) – Grace Conley
 From This Day Forward (1946) – Alice Beesley
 Strange Impersonation (1946) – Talkative Nurse
 Swing Parade of 1946 (1946) – Marie Finch
 One Exciting Week (1946) – Mabel Taylor
 It's a Wonderful Life (1946) – Cousin Tilly
 A Likely Story (1947) – Nurse (uncredited)
 Merton of the Movies (1947) – Gladys (uncredited)
 Shed No Tears (1948) – Hilda – the Maid (uncredited)
 Texas, Brooklyn & Heaven (1948) – Wife (uncredited)
 The Snake Pit (1948) – Nurse Jones (uncredited)
 Let's Live a Little (1948) – Miss Adams
 And Baby Makes Three (1949) – Mrs. Bennett (uncredited)
 Young Daniel Boone (1950) – Helen Bryan
 The Fuller Brush Girl (1950) – Woman Selling Magazine (uncredited)
 The Stooge (1951) – Ms. Regan (uncredited)
 Room for One More (1952) – Grace Roberts
 Sailor Beware (1952) – Ginger
 Dreamboat (1953) – Wife in Bar (uncredited)
 Let's Do It Again (1953) – Nelly – the Maid
 Clipped Wings (1953) – Mildred
 The Eternal Sea (1955) – Admitting Nurse (uncredited)
 When Gangland Strikes (1956) – Emily Parsons
 The Birds and the Bees (1956) – Mrs. Burnside
 Calling Homicide (1956) – Flo Burton – Script Girl (uncredited)
 Bundle of Joy (1956) – Matron
 The Go-Getter (1956) – Miss Wellington, aptitude tester
 Public Pigeon No. 1 (1957) – Mrs. Bates (uncredited)
 Hold That Hypnotist (1957) – Hotel Maid (uncredited)
 Gun Duel in Durango (1957) – Spinster
 The Last Stagecoach West (1957) – Miss Feeney, Bryceson's Secretary (uncredited)
 The Joker Is Wild (1957) – Heckler (uncredited)
 The Sad Sack (1957) – Sgt. Hansen
 Rock-A-Bye Baby (1958) – Nurse
 I Married a Monster from Outer Space (1958) – Mother Bradley (uncredited)
 Don't Give Up the Ship (1959) – Mother at Wedding Party (uncredited)
 Career (1959) – Marie, Secretary to Shirley Drake
 All in a Night's Work (1961) – Miss Schuster
 Ada (1961) – Clubwoman with Pecan Pie (uncredited)
 Bachelor in Paradise (1961) – Mrs. Bruce Freedman (uncredited)
 The Errand Boy (1961) – Commissary Cashier
 Girls! Girls! Girls! (1962) – Mrs. Figgot – Hat Customer (uncredited)
 Fun in Acapulco (1963) – Mrs Stevers (uncredited)
 Who's Minding the Store? (1963) – Mattress Customer
 Paradise, Hawaiian Style (1966) – Mrs. Belden
 The Strongest Man in the World (1975) – Mercedes
 Goodbye, Franklin High (1978) – Teacher

Television
The Life of Riley as Millie in "Assistant Manager" (1949) starring Jackie Gleason as Riley
The Gene Autry Show (2 episodes, 1952)
Willy (series regular, 1954–1955) as Emily Dodger
Crossroads in "Broadway Trust" (1955)
The George Burns and Gracie Allen Show as Mrs. Curtis in "George's Mother-in-Law Trouble" (1955)
Four Star Playhouse as Madeline in "A Kiss for Mr. Lincoln" (1955) 
It's a Great Life as  Thelma Purcell in "A Job for Kathy" (1955)
Climax! in "The Day They Gave the Babies Away" (1955)
Hey, Jeannie! as Katie in "Jeannie the Policewoman" (1957)
The Jack Benny Program (1957, 1962, 2 episodes)
The Donna Reed Show (1958–1965, 3 episodes)
Bourbon Street Beat as Clairibelle in "Mrs. Viner Vanishes" (1959)
M Squad as Mary Cosgrove in "Voluntary Surrender" (1959) starring Lee Marvin
Dennis the Menace (1960, season 2 episode 6)
The Ann Sothern Show (1959–1960, 2 episodes)
The DuPont Show with June Allyson as Hazel in "The Doctor and the Redhead" (1960)
The Loretta Young Show as Aunt Gladys in "Off-Duty Affair" (1960)
The Andy Griffith Show (1960–1962, 3 episodes)
Pete and Gladys (1961–1962, 2 episodes) with Harry Morgan and Cara Williams
Bonanza (1961–1962, 2 episodes)
Ichabod and Me in "The Old Stowe Road" and "Women's Rights" (1962)
The Joey Bishop Show (1962–1965)
Perry Mason as Bess in "The Case of the Baffling Bug" (1965)
Please Don't Eat the Daisies as Mabel in "Help Wanted, Desperately" (1967)
The Brady Bunch as Kay in "Goodbye, Alice, Hello" (1972) 
Here's Lucy as Mary Winters in "Lucy Fights the System" (1974) 
Laverne and Shirley as Nana Shotz in "The Society Party" (1976)
The Dukes of Hazzard as Aunt Clara Coltrane in "Sadie Hogg Day" (1981)

References

External links

 

1907 births
1989 deaths
20th-century American actresses
American film actresses
American television actresses
Actresses from St. Louis
Actresses from Los Angeles
Deaths from cancer in California
Harvard-Westlake School alumni
California Republicans
Missouri Republicans
American Roman Catholics